The Academy of Experimental Criminology (abbreviated AEC) is a learned society founded in 1998 in order to recognize scholars who have made influential researchers in the field of experimental criminology. It does so by electing fellows annually, and by honoring criminologists with its Joan McCord and Young Experimental Scholar Awards.  The Academy was co-founded by David P. Farrington, who served as its second president from 2001 to 2003. The other founder was Lawrence W. Sherman, who served as its founding president from 1999 to 2001. It sponsors the Journal of Experimental Criminology, which was established in 2005.

Presidents
Lawrence W. Sherman (1999-2001)
David P. Farrington (2001-2003)
Joan McCord (2003-2004)
David Weisburd (2004-2007)
Doris L. MacKenzie (2007-2009)
Lorraine Mazerolle (2009-2011)
Anthony Braga (2011-2013)
Adrian Raine (2013-2015)
Peter W. Greenwood (2015-2017)
Friedrich Losel (2017–2019)
Heather Strang  (2019-2022)

References

Criminology organizations
Learned societies of the United States
Organizations established in 1998